Pernik Municipality is a municipality in the Pernik Province of Bulgaria.

Demography

At the 2011 census, the population of Pernik was 97,181. Most of the inhabitants were Bulgarians (91.4%) with a minority of Gypsies/Romani (1.83%). 6.36% of the population's ethnicity was unknown.

Villages
In addition to the capital town of Pernik, the following villages are located in the municipality:

References

Municipalities in Pernik Province